Aleia Hobbs (born February 24, 1996) is an American professional track and field athlete specializing in the sprints. She claimed three collegiate titles in 2018, winning the 60 meters at the NCAA Division I Indoor Championships and the 100 meters and  relay at the NCAA Division I Championships, adding the 100 m U.S. title. Hobbs is the North American indoor record holder for the 60 m with a time of 6.94 seconds set in February 2023, becoming the second-fastest woman of all time at the event.

Biography
Aleia Hobbs committed to the LSU Lady Tigers in 2014 and ran for them until mid 2018, when she turned pro and signed a sponsorship deal with adidas. During her time at LSU, she also represented the United States at the 2015 Pan American Junior Championships, where she earned a silver medal in the 100 m and a gold medal in the  relay.

Hobbs represented the United States at the 2019 World Relays, anchoring the United States to gold.

On April 3, 2021, Hobbs opened her outdoor season at the Battle on the Bayou in New Orleans, Louisiana with a world-leading time of 10.99 s in the 100 m.

On February 18, 2023, she stormed up to second on the world 60 m all-time list with a time of 6.94 seconds, just 0.02 s shy of 30-year-old Irina Privalova's world record, at the U.S. Indoor Championships in Albuquerque, New Mexico. Hobbs took 0.01 s off the North American indoor record set by Gail Devers also in 1993.

Statistics
Information from World Athletics profile unless otherwise noted.

Personal bests

International championship results

100 m circuit wins
 Diamond League
 2019: Shanghai Diamond League
 2022: Lausanne Athletissima

100 m seasonal bests

National championship results

NCAA results from Track & Field Results Reporting System.

Notes

External links

 
 
 
 
 
 
 Aleia Hobbs bio at LSU Tigers and Lady Tigers

1996 births
Living people
African-American female track and field athletes
American female sprinters
Track and field athletes from New Orleans
LSU Lady Tigers track and field athletes
United States collegiate record holders in athletics (track and field)
USA Outdoor Track and Field Championships winners
Medalists at the 2020 Summer Olympics
Olympic silver medalists for the United States in track and field
Athletes (track and field) at the 2020 Summer Olympics
21st-century African-American sportspeople
21st-century African-American women